Odair Albornoz Rivas, known as Odair (born 15 October 1973) is a former Brazilian football player.

He played 7 seasons and 174 games (scoring 18 goals) in the Primeira Liga for Braga, Penafiel and Belenenses.

Club career
He made his Primeira Liga debut for Braga on 30 August 1998 as a starter in a 2–0 victory against Farense.

References

1973 births
Sportspeople from Minas Gerais
Living people
Brazilian footballers
Esporte Clube Democrata players
Clube Atlético Mineiro players
Cruzeiro Esporte Clube players
S.C. Braga players
Brazilian expatriate footballers
Expatriate footballers in Portugal
Brazilian expatriate sportspeople in Portugal
Primeira Liga players
C.F. Os Belenenses players
F.C. Penafiel players
Liga Portugal 2 players
Uberlândia Esporte Clube players
Araxá Esporte Clube players
Mineiros Esporte Clube players
Association football defenders